Piz Ajüz (2,788 m) is a mountain in the Sesvenna Range of the Alps, located south-east of Scuol in the canton of Graubünden. It lies north of Piz Triazza, on the range between the Val Triazza and the Val d'Uina.

References

External links
 Piz Ajüz on Hikr

Mountains of the Alps
Mountains of Graubünden
Mountains of Switzerland
Two-thousanders of Switzerland
Scuol